ISO/IEC JTC 1/SC 6 Telecommunications and information exchange between systems is a standardization subcommittee of the Joint Technical Committee ISO/IEC JTC 1. It is part of the International Organization for Standardization (ISO) and the International Electrotechnical Commission (IEC), which develops and facilitates standards within the field of telecommunications and information exchange between systems. 

ISO/IEC JTC 1/SC 6 was established in 1964, following the creation of a Special Working Group under ISO/TC 97 on Data Link Control Procedures and Modem Interfaces. The international secretariat of ISO/IEC JTC 1/SC 6 is the Korean Agency for Technology and Standards (KATS), located in South Korea.

Scope
The scope of ISO/IEC JTC 1/SC 6 is “Standardization in the field of telecommunications dealing with the exchange of information between open systems including system functions, procedures, parameters as well as the conditions for their use. The standardization encompasses protocols and services of lower layers, including physical, data link, network, and transport as well as those of upper layers including but not limited to Directory and ASN.1.”

Future Network has recently been added as an important work scope. A considerable part of the work is done in effective cooperation with ITU-T and other standardization bodies including IEEE 802 and Ecma International.

Structure
ISO/IEC JTC 1/SC 6 has three active working groups (WGs), each of which carries out specific tasks in standards development within the field of telecommunications and information exchange between systems.  The focus of each working group is described in the group’s terms of reference. Working groups can be established if new working areas arise, or disbanded if the group’s working area is no longer relevant to standardization needs. Active working groups of ISO/IEC JTC 1/SC 6 are:

Collaborations
ISO/IEC JTC 1/SC 6 works in close collaboration with a number of other organizations or subcommittees, both internal and external to ISO or IEC. Organizations internal to ISO or IEC that collaborate with or are in liaison with ISO/IEC JTC 1/SC 6 include:

 ISO/IEC JTC 1/WG 7, Sensor networks
 ISO/IEC JTC 1/SC 17, Cards and personal identification
 ISO/IEC JTC 1/SC 25, Interconnection of information technology equipment
 ISO/IEC JTC 1/SC 27, IT security techniques
 ISO/IEC JTC 1/SC 29, Coding of audio, picture, multimedia and hypermedia information
 ISO/IEC JTC 1/SC 31, Automatic identification and data capture techniques
 ISO/IEC JTC 1/SC 38, Distributed application platforms & services (DAPS)
 ISO/TC 68, Financial services
 ISO/TC 122, Packaging
 ISO/TC 184/SC 5, Interoperability, integration, and architectures for enterprise systems and automation applications
 ISO/TC 215, Health Informatics
 IEC/SC 46A, Coaxial cables
 IEC/SC 46C, Wires and symmetric cables
 IEC/TC 48, Electrical connectors and mechanical structures for electrical and electronic equipment
 IEC/SC 48B, Electrical connectors
 IEC/TC 65, Industrial-process measurement, control and automation
 IEC/SC 65C, Industrial networks
 IEC/TC 86, Fibre optics
 IEC/SC 86C, Fibre optic systems and active devices 
 IEC/TC 93, Design automation

Some organizations external to ISO or IEC that collaborate with or are in liaison to ISO/IEC JTC 1/SC 6 include:
 European Conference of Postal and Telecommunications Administrations (CEPT)
 European Organization for Nuclear Research (CERN)
 European Commission (EC)
 European Telecommunications Standards Institute (ETSI)
 Ecma International
 International Civil Aviation Organization (ICAO)
 IEEE 802 LMSC (LAN/MAN Standards Committee)
 Internet Society (ISOC)
 International Telecommunications Satellite Organization (ITSO)
 ITU-T
 Organization for the Advancement of Structured Information Standards (OASIS)
 NFC Forum
 MFA Forum
 United Nations Conference on Trade and Development (UNCTAD)
 United Nations Economic Commission for Europe (UNECE)
 Universal Postal Union (UPU)
 World Meteorological Organization (WMO)
 CEN/TC 247/WG 4

Member countries
Countries pay a fee to ISO to be members of subcommittees.

The 19 "P" (participating) members of ISO/IEC JTC 1/SC 6 are: Austria, Belgium, Canada, China, Czech Republic, Finland, Germany, Greece, Jamaica, Japan, Kazakhstan, Republic of Korea, Netherlands, Russian Federation, Spain, Switzerland, Tunisia, United Kingdom, and United States.

The 31 "O" (observing) members of ISO/IEC JTC 1/SC 6 are: Argentina, Bosnia and Herzegovina, Colombia, Cuba, Cyprus, France, Ghana, Hong Kong, Hungary, Iceland, India, Indonesia, Islamic Republic of Iran, Ireland, Italy, Kenya, Luxembourg, Malaysia, Malta, New Zealand, Norway, Philippines, Poland, Romania, Saudi Arabia, Serbia, Singapore, Slovenia, Thailand, Turkey, and Ukraine.

Published standards
There are 365 published standards under the direct responsibility of ISO/IEC JTC 1/SC 6. Published standards by ISO/IEC JTC 1/SC 6 include:

See also
 ISO/IEC JTC 1
 List of ISO standards
 Korean Agency for Technology and Standards
 International Organization for Standardization
 International Electrotechnical Commission

References

External links 
 ISO/IEC JTC 1/SC 6 page at ISO

006
Telecommunications